Laure Wynants is a Belgian epidemiologist who is a professor at Maastricht University. She studies prediction models in medicine and hospital acquired infections.

Early life and education 
Wynants studied biostatistics at KU Leuven in Belgium. She remained there for her doctoral research, where she focused on prediction models. Her doctorate sought to predict whether ovarian tumours are benign or malignant, and how likely it is that the insertion of a catheter will cause bloodstream infection.

Research and career 
Wynants is an assistant professor at KU Leuven. She has focused on gynaecological cancers and hospital-acquired infections. She develops prediction models, models which combine a broad range of patient characteristics to understand individual probabilities of suffering from a certain disease.

In the early days of the COVID-19 pandemic, Wynants became concerned about the lack of scientific rigour applied to decision-making in COVID-19. She was particularly interested in translating her understanding of prediction models to better anticipate the outcomes of patients with COVID-19, for example, whether prediction models could help to identify which patients should be tested, determine whether patients could recover at home, or understand who needed to be taken to critical care. Despite considerable investment into artificial intelligence tools, machine-learning algorithms failed to bring support to physicians on the front-lines. She argued that poor-quality, mislabeled data and data from unknown sources resulted in mediocre tools. Wynants eventually established a consortium to understand COVID-19. Specifically, she created a living review  to collate information on COVID-19 from published research and translate it into clinical practise.

In 2020, Wynants was awarded the Edmond Hustinx Prize by Maastricht University. In 2022, Significance named Wynants as among ten women statisticians who helped the world to understand COVID-19.

Selected publications

References 

Living people
KU Leuven alumni
Academic staff of Maastricht University
Belgian epidemiologists
Belgian women scientists
Year of birth missing (living people)
Women epidemiologists